The women's lightweight double sculls competition at the 2016 Summer Olympics in Rio de Janeiro was held on 8–12 August at the Lagoon Rodrigo de Freitas.

The medals for the competition were presented by Poul-Erik Høyer, Denmark, member of the International Olympic Committee, and the gifts were presented by Tricia Smith, Canada, Vice President of the International Rowing Federation.

Results

Heats
First two of each heat qualify to the semifinals, remainder goes to the repechage.

Heat 1

Heat 2

Heat 3

Heat 4

Repechage
First two of each heat qualify to the semifinals A/B, remainder goes to the semifinals C/D.

Repechage 1

Repechage 2

Semifinals C/D 
First three of each heat qualify to the Final C, remainder goes to the Final D.

Semifinal C/D 1

Semifinal C/D 2

Semifinals A/B

Semifinals A/B 1
First three of each heat qualify to the Final A, remainder goes to the Final B.

Semifinals A/B 2
First three of each heat qualify to the Final A, remainder goes to the Final B.

Finals

Final D

Final C

Final B

Final A

References

Women's lightweight double sculls
Women's events at the 2016 Summer Olympics